Leslie Peterson (born 1923) is a Canadian politician.

Leslie Peterson can also refer to:
Leslie Esdaile Banks (born Leslie Ann Peterson, 1959–2011), American writer
Leslie Peterson (bishop) (1928–2003), Canadian bishop

See also 
Leslie Petersen, American politician, former Democratic candidate for Governor of Wyoming